The Pakistan Boxing Federation (PBF) is the governing body of amateur boxing in Pakistan. The Pakistan Amateur Boxing Federation (PBF) organizes all amateur matches countrywide. It is also responsible for scouting and raising boxers from Pakistan to compete on a worldwide level.

Notable boxers 
Pakistan has seen success at amateur level boxing, despite lack of necessary equipment and facilities. They have won medals at the Olympic and Commonwealth Games. Examples include Quetta-born Haider Ali who won gold at the 2002 Commonwealth Games in the featherweight event, and went on to become a professional boxer. Asghar Ali Shah is a two-time Olympian with 13 gold and 10 silver medals at international level. Hussain Shah won a bronze medal in the middleweight event at the 1988 Summer Olympics, while Muhammad Waseem won bronze and silver medals at the 2010 and 2014 Commonwealth Games.

In 2016, a body of professional boxing in Pakistan has been formed. It is named as Pakistan Boxing Council PBC is headed by Olympian boxer Abdul Rasheed Baloch and it is only and separate body from PBF.

Pakistan’s most successful boxer Muhammad Waseem became the first Boxer in South Asia to challenge for a world title, and the first to be ranked in the top 20.

Affiliation
 International Boxing Association
 Asian Boxing Confederation
 Pakistan Olympic Association
 Pakistan Sports Board

References

External links
 Official Website

Boxing in Pakistan
Boxing
National members of the Asian Boxing Confederation
Sports organizations established in 1948
1948 establishments in Pakistan
Amateur boxing organizations